Bob Irvin (born September 9, 1948) was an early leader of the modern Republican Party in Georgia in the United States. He was a member of the Long Range Planning Committee in the 1970s, along with Mack Mattingly, Paul Coverdell, Newt Gingrich, and John Linder. He served 15 years in the Georgia House of Representatives, in the 1970s and again in the 1990s. He ran for the State House in 1990, but lost the Republican primary to Dorothy Felton by 227 votes. He was elected to his second stint in the State House after incumbent Mitch Skandalakis was elected to the Fulton County Board of Commissioners in November 1993. He was the House Republican Leader 1994–2000, known for passing welfare reform and tax cuts. He ran unsuccessfully for the United States Senate in 2002, losing to Saxby Chambliss.  He attracted attention in early 2005 by publicly calling for Ralph Reed to withdraw from the race for Lieutenant Governor of Georgia.

Biography
Irvin grew up in Roswell, GA. He was valedictorian at Lovett School in 1966, and Phi Beta Kappa at William & Mary, where he was editor of the newspaper. He graduated from Emory Law School on a full scholarship and earned an MBA at Harvard Business School. He was a partner at McKinsey & Co. and at Bridge Strategy Group.

He has been interviewed on video 3 times by the University of Georgia and once by West Georgia on the growth of the Republican party in Georgia (videos available on the internet).
Irvin was a founding member of the Roswell Historical Society, and has served on numerous nonprofit boards, including the Atlanta Historical Society, Georgia Common Cause, and the Atlanta Chamber Players.

References

External links
 
 Profile at Vote Smart
 2002 campaign website

|-

|-

|-

Living people
Members of the Georgia House of Representatives
21st-century American politicians
College of William & Mary alumni
Emory University School of Law alumni
Harvard Business School alumni
1948 births